Open Sesame is the eighth studio album by the funk band Kool & the Gang, released in 1976. The album yielded the hit title track, "Open Sesame", which achieved some success, first as a top ten R&B single, then later as part of the Saturday Night Fever soundtrack. "Super Band" also reached the R&B top twenty. The album was the second of two albums released by the band in 1976.

Record World said that in the title track the group is "laying down a funky backbeat geared for the discos."

Track listing

Personnel
Kool & the Gang
 Ronald Bell – arrangements (1, 2, 5, 6, 8), vocals, keyboards, clavinet, ARP synthesizer, ARP String Ensemble, percussion, vibraphone, tenor saxophone, alto flute
 Ricky West – vocals (1), vibraphone (3), keyboards (4, 8)
 Claydes Charles Smith – acoustic guitar, electric guitar, percussion, arrangements (3, 4)
 Robert "Kool" Bell – bass guitar, percussion, vocals, 
 George Brown – drums, percussion, keyboards (7), clavinet (7), vocals (7), arrangements (7)
 Dennis Thomas – alto saxophone, flute, percussion, congas, vocals
 Otha Nash – slide trombone, valve trombone, percussion, vocals 
 Larry Gittens – trumpet, flugelhorn 
 Robert "Spike" Mickens – trumpet, flugelhorn, percussion

Additional Personnel 
 Jimmy J. Jordan – special effects
 Ellouise Daughn – harp
 Don Boyce – vocals
 Cynthia Huggins – lead vocals (2, 5, 7, 8)
 Donna Johnson – lead vocals (2)
 Something Sweet (Renee Connel, Cynthia Huggins, Joan Motley and Beverly Owens)– backing vocals
 Carry Muse – backing vocals (7)

Production
 Produced and Arranged by Kool & The Gang
 Co-Producer – George Brown 
 Executive Producers – Ronald Bell and Claydes Charles Smith
 Engineers – Terry Rosilleo and Nils Salminen
 Mixing – Terry Rosilleo
 Mastered by Nimitr Sarikanada at Frankfurt/Wayne Recording Labs (Philadelphia, PA).

References

External links
 

Kool & the Gang albums
1976 albums
De-Lite Records albums